Bernabe is a given name.

Those bearing it include:

 Bernabe Rivera (fl. 1830s), Uruguayan ruling-family member & genocidist  of the Charrua people
 Bernabe Buscayno (born 1950s), Philippine soldier and activist
 Bernabe Gonzalez Garcia (born 1933), American religious leader
 Bernabe Concepcion (born 1988), Filipino boxer
 Bernabé Zapata Miralles (born 1997), Spanish tennis player